The Manasi River (also called Manas) is in the south of Dzungarian Basin, Xinjiang, China.

However, due to the water diversion for irrigation and other needs, the Manas River's water has not reached the eponymous lake since the 1960s, and the lake has gone dry.

The reservoirs and canals form an extensive irrigation system in the area.

Notes

Rivers of Xinjiang